Fatehabad is a village in Surkh Rod District, Nangarhar Province, Afghanistan.

History
Fatehabad has been the site of two major battles:

During the Afghan Wars of Succession, a battle was fought there in 1041
During the Second Anglo-Afghan War, a battle was fought there in 1879

See also 
Nangarhar Province

References

Populated places in Nangarhar Province
Villages in Afghanistan